Crotalus stejnegeri, commonly known as the Sinaloan long-tailed rattlesnake or just long-tailed rattlesnake, is a venomous pit viper species in the family Viperidae. The species is native to western Mexico. There are no recognized subspecies.

Etymology
The specific name, stejnegeri, is in honor of Leonhard Stejneger, herpetologist at the Smithsonian Institution for over 60 years.

Description

The tail is relatively long, representing 11.0-14.8% of the total length of adult male snakes and 9.8-12.5% in females. Klauber (1940) suggested that since the rattle is tiny, it is probably not audible. A very rare species, there have only been 12 specimens found.

Geographic range and habitat
The type locality given is "Plumosas [Plomosas], Sinaloa, Mexico". It occurs in pine-oak forest, subtropical dry forest, and tropical deciduous forest.

Conservation status

C. stejnegeri is classified as Vulnerable on the IUCN Red List of Threatened Species with the following criteria: B1ab(iii) (v3.1, 2001). A species is listed as such when the best available evidence indicates its extent of occurrence is estimated to be less than 20,000 km2 (7,720 mi2), estimates indicate it is severely fragmented or known to exist at no more than 10 locations, and a continuing decline has been observed, inferred, or projected in its area, extent, and/or quality of habitat. Therefore, it is considered to be facing a high risk of extinction in the wild. The population trend was down when assessed in 2007.

References

Further reading

 (Crotalus stejnegeri, new species).
Heimes, Peter (2016). Snakes of Mexico: Herpetofauna Mexicana Vol. I. Frankfurt am Main, Germany: Chimaira. 572 pp. .

External links

stejnegeri
Snakes of North America
Endemic reptiles of Mexico
Fauna of Western Mexico
Natural history of Durango
Natural history of Sinaloa
Natural history of Nayarit
Reptiles described in 1919
Taxa named by Emmett Reid Dunn
Fauna of the Sierra Madre Occidental
Sinaloan dry forests